David Sauget (born 23 November 1979) is a French former professional footballer who played as a defender.

External links
 
 Career stats at lfp.fr

1979 births
Living people
French footballers
Association football defenders
FC Sochaux-Montbéliard players
FC Rouen players
Racing Besançon players
SC Bastia players
AS Nancy Lorraine players
AS Saint-Étienne players
Grenoble Foot 38 players
Ligue 1 players
Ligue 2 players